In Mandaean cosmology, Piriawis (sometimes also spelled Biriawiš ), also known as the Yardna Rabba ( "Great Jordan"), is the sacred life-giving river (yardna) of the World of Light. It is the heavenly counterpart of rivers on earth (Tibil), which are considered by Mandaeans to be manifestations of the heavenly Piriawis.

Shilmai and Nidbai are the two guardian uthras (celestial beings) watching over Piriawis.

Qolasta prayers 13 and 17 mention Piriawis-Ziwa and Piriafil-Malaka together as uthras.

Other names
In Book 4 of the Right Ginza, Sindiriawis is mentioned as "the great yardna of the Life"

See also
Yardna
Ganga (goddess) in Hinduism
Siniawis, its corresponding opposite in the World of Darkness
Jordan River
Yesseus Mazareus Yessedekeus, the name of the Living Water in Sethianism

References

Mythological rivers
Mandaean cosmology
Jordan River
Rivers in Mandaeism
Uthras
Personifications of rivers
Personifications in Mandaeism